The Halechiniscidae are a family of tardigrades. The family was named and first described by Gustav Thulin in 1928.

Subfamilies and genera
They are divided into the following subfamilies and genera:
 Dipodarctinae Pollock, 1995
 Dipodarctus Pollock, 1995
 Euclavarctinae Renaud-Mornant, 1983
 Clavarctus Renaud-Mornant, 1983
 Euclavarctus Renaud-Mornant, 1975
 Exoclavarctus Renaud-Mornant, 1983
 Moebjergarctus Bussau, 1992
 Parmursa Renaud-Mornant, 1984
 Proclavarctus Renaud-Mornant, 1983
 Florarctinae Renaud-Mornant, 1982
 Florarctus Delamare Deboutteville & Renaud-Mornant, 1965
 Ligiarctus Renaud-Mornant, 1982
 Wingstrandarctus Kristensen, 1984
 Halechiniscinae Thulin, 1928
 Chrysoarctus Renaud-Mornant, 1984
 Halechiniscus Richters, 1908
 Orzeliscinae Schulz, 1963
 Mutaparadoxipus Gross, Miller & Hochberg, 2014
 Opydorscus Renaud-Mornant, 1989
 Orzeliscus du Bois-Reymond Marcus, 1952
 Paradoxipus Kristensen & Higgins, 1989
 Quisarctinae Fujimoto, 2015
 Quisarctus Fujimoto, 2015

References

Further reading

Thulin, Über die Phylogenie und das System der Tardigraden (On the Phylogeny and the System of Tardigrade). Hereditas (1928), no. 2/3, p. 207-266

 
Tardigrade families